Glenda Goertzen (born 1967) is a Canadian author of children's and young adult fantasy, including the best-selling children's novel The Prairie Dogs.

Life and work

Glenda Goertzen commenced her writing career at the age of four with picture books and comic books to share with her friends. Her first act upon attending school was to vandalize her Dick and Jane books by adding her own characters to the pages. An annual project involved absconding with her mother's copy of the Sears Christmas catalogue and creating her own little adventure within its pages. The plot involved a band of tiny children trying to make their way to the toy section. There was a challenge on every page—trying to avoid getting stepped on in the shoe section, for example, or treasure hunting in the jewellery department.

The first draft of The Prairie Dogs was written while she was in high school. The novel was based on the imaginary adventures of her childhood toys and the real adventures of dogs she had grown up with. When she attended university, however, it was to get a degree in Film and Video from the University of Regina so she could be a cartoon animation artist. She enjoyed a brief career as a computer graphics and animation artist, then went to work for CKTV Regina in a variety of technical positions. Much of her writing took place during quiet graveyard shifts. Early drafts of manuscripts were scribbled on the back of programming sheets for The Flintstones and other favourite shows. In the course of producing a short children's program, she met local children's authors who encouraged her to pursue her own writing career.

In 1998 she moved to Saskatoon to take the Library and Information Program at SIAST. While working on a homework assignment, she picked up a piece of scrap paper and noticed it was a page from a draft of The Prairie Dogs, discarded after an unsuccessful attempt to have it published years earlier. She dug up the old manuscript and started reworking it. Shortly after moving to Prince Albert, Saskatchewan to launch her new library career, The Prairie Dogs was published by Fitzhenry & Whiteside.

Goertzen's trademark style is a fast-paced balance of humour and suspense. Her love of biology and quirky ecosystems plays a strong role in her books.

The Prairie Dogs

Meet Pierre, the abandoned agility champion; Dare, the terrier that nothing can scare; Mouse, the fainting Chihuahua; and Mew, the puppy who thinks she's a cat. Together, they're the Prairie Dogs, their mission to have fun and stay out of trouble. Quick wits and quick feet keep the little strays one step ahead of disaster until the night a friend's life is in danger. To save him, the Prairie Dogs must leave the safety of their badger burrow hideout to venture deep into the heart of a rival pack's territory. And the Bull Dogs aren't the only dangers awaiting them in the prairie night...

City Dogs

When Pierre and Dare are abducted from their small prairie town, their friends hop a train to the big city to rescue them. New companions and old enemies join the Prairie Dogs as they race through the city in an effort to be reunited with one another. With the help of a team of sled dogs and a smoking magpie, they manage to elude a pair of ruthless thieves, television cameras, and the dreaded Crunchy Nibbles. But time is running out—Dare's new puppies are on the way!

Miracle Dogs

After meeting a group of Assistance Dogs, Pierre decides to train his troublesome puppies for this prestigious career. His efforts are sabotaged by his outrageously misbehaving companions, a band of feral cats who have a score to settle with Dare, and a freak accident on the Telemiracle stage. If the Prairie Dogs ever want to see the puppies again, they will have to brave the perils of the winter prairie to perform a desperate rescue mission. It will take a miracle just to get everyone home!

The Prairie Dogs reflects Goertzen's own childhood; moving from a big city to a small town, long walks across the prairie, her interest in prairie animals. City Dogs reflects her older years, particularly the years she worked in a TV station. Miracle Dogs reflects many different areas of her life. Its setting includes a museum; a combination of the award-winning museum in her home town of Morse, Saskatchewan and the Royal Saskatchewan Museum, which she visited frequently as a little girl. It also takes place at Telemiracle. Goertzen attended several Telemiracle productions, both as an audience member and as a CKTV employee.

Lady Oak Abroad

The first year of the new millennium has not been kind to Audrey O'Krane. She's been run over by a bus, her boyfriend dumped her, her principal just expelled her. She longs to discard her dysfunctional world and start over. Her wish is about to come true—in more ways than one. When her batty old aunt disappears through a portal in their front yard, Audrey discovers Migrara, one of the many fascinating worlds that overlap our own. Migrara is home to an array of bizarre and often dangerous characters, including Keirt, a quirky young mage hunting a powerful enemy. Audrey herself turns out to be a powerful "worldhopper" with the ability to travel from world to world. She gladly abandons Earth to join Keirt on his quest. But the beautiful Migrara hides a terrible secret. It's up to Audrey to challenge the most dangerous forces in the universe to save her friends, her family, and her world.

Goertzen wrote Lady Oak Abroad to entertain and empower female readers of fantasy/science fiction. The intricately plotted novel is a unique blend of humour, romance and adventure, powered by a boundless imagination.

Bibliography
The Prairie Dogs (2005), 
City Dogs (2007), 
Miracle Dogs (2012), 
Lady Oak Abroad (2014)  (eBook)  (print)

Selected awards and honours

 2005 Saskatchewan Book Award shortlist for The Prairie Dogs
 2006 Ontario Library Association Silver Birch Award shortlist for The Prairie Dogs
 2006/2007 Saskatchewan Young Readers' Choice Diamond Willow Award shortlist for The Prairie Dogs
 2007 Saskatchewan Book Award shortlist for City Dogs
 2008 Canadian Children's Book Centre's Best Books for Kids & Teens, City Dogs

References

Saskatchewan Book Awards 2005 nominees
The Prairie Dogs (Review)

External links

Living people
1967 births
Canadian children's writers
Canadian writers of young adult literature
Canadian fantasy writers
Canadian science fiction writers
Women science fiction and fantasy writers
Canadian women novelists
Canadian women children's writers
Women humorists
21st-century Canadian women writers
21st-century Canadian novelists
People from Morse, Saskatchewan
Writers from Prince Albert, Saskatchewan
Writers from Saskatchewan
Women writers of young adult literature